John Fleming may refer to:

Politics 
John Fleming (14th-century MP) for Rochester
John Fleming, 2nd Lord Fleming (c. 1465–1524), Scottish nobleman
John Fleming, 5th Lord Fleming ((1529–1572), Lord Chamberlain of Scotland, 1565–1572
John Fleming (Southampton MP) (1743–1802), Tory politician in England
John Fleming (Gatton and Saltash MP) (1747–1829), British surgeon, naturalist, and politician
John Willis Fleming (1781–1844), MP for Hampshire and South Hampshire
John Fleming (Devonport MP), 19th-century politician
John Fleming (Canadian politician) (1819–1877), Ontario businessman and political figure
John M. Fleming (1832–1900), American politician and newspaper editor
John Fleming (Scottish politician) (1847–1925),Liberal MP for Aberdeen South
John Fleming (American politician) (born 1951), Republican U.S. representative for Louisiana's 4th congressional district
John Fleming, 1st Earl of Wigtown (1567–1619), Scottish aristocrat and diplomat

Sport
Jackie Fleming (John Fleming), English rugby league footballer
John Fleming (footballer, born 1953), English footballer
John Fleming (footballer, born 1889) (1889–1916), Scottish footballer
John Fleming (sport shooter) (1881–1965), British sport shooter
Jock Fleming (1864–1934), Scottish footballer
John Fleming (rugby union) (born 1953), New Zealand rugby union player
John Fleming (1901–1961), Scottish boxer who fought under the name Johnny Brown

Other people 
John Fleming (art historian) (1919–2001), British art historian
John Fleming (engineer) (born 1951), Liverpool-born former head of Ford of Europe
John Fleming (judge) (1697–1766), American judge in Virginia
John Fleming (naturalist) (1785–1857), Scottish zoologist and geologist
John Fleming (New York judge) (1842–1918), Queens County district attorney and New York judge 
John Fleming (painter) (1792–1845), Scottish painter
John Fleming (Australian priest) (born 1943), Australian priest and bioethicist
John Fleming (dean of Ross)
John Fleming (DJ) (born 1969), English trance producer and DJ
John Adam Fleming (1877–1956), American physicist
John Ambrose Fleming (1849–1945), English electrical engineer and inventor of the Fleming Valve
John V. Fleming (born 1936), American literary critic and professor
John Fleming (bishop) (born 1948), Irish Roman Catholic clergyman
John Arnold Fleming (1871–1966), industrial chemist
John Gibson Fleming (1809–1879), Scottish surgeon and medical administrator
Sir John Fleming, 1st Baronet, Irish baronet

See also
John Le Fleming (1865–1942), English cricketer and rugby union player
John Flammang Schrank (1876–1943), American who attempted to assassinate Theodore Roosevelt
Jack Fleming (1924–2001), American sports announcer
John Flemming (1941–2003), English economist and Wadham College warden
John Flemming (racing driver) (born 1967), Canadian racing driver
John Fleeming, 18th-century American printer